Rahmatullah Sahaq (born 29 September 1993) is an Afghan cricketer. He made his Twenty20 debut for Amo Sharks in the 2017 Shpageeza Cricket League on 17 September 2017. In October 2017, in his second first-class match, he made 176 not out for Mis Ainak Region in the 2017–18 Ahmad Shah Abdali 4-day Tournament.

He made his List A debut for Mis Ainak Region in the 2018 Ghazi Amanullah Khan Regional One Day Tournament on 10 July 2018.

References

External links
 

1993 births
Living people
Afghan cricketers
Amo Sharks cricketers
Place of birth missing (living people)